Empress Zhang (250 – 254), personal name unknown, was an empress of Cao Wei during the Three Kingdoms period of China. She was the second wife of Cao Fang, the third emperor of Cao Wei.

Not much is known about her, other than her grandfather Zhang Ji (張既) was a governor of Liang Province (covering roughly present-day Gansu) and that her father Zhang Ji (張緝; note different Chinese character for Ji) was a commandery administrator. She was created empress in 252; at that time, her grandfather was already deceased, while her father was promoted to senior minister.  (It is unclear whether she was an imperial consort before she was created empress.)

In 254, the regent Sima Shi killed Cao Fang's confidant, the official Li Feng (a friend of Zhang Ji). He then falsely accused Li Feng, Zhang Ji and their friend Xiahou Xuan of treason, and had all of them and their clans executed. One month later, Cao Fang was forced to depose Empress Zhang. It is not known what her fate was, although it would appear likely that she was put under house arrest for the rest of her life but not executed along with the rest of her family.

See also
 Cao Wei family trees#Cao Fang
 Lists of people of the Three Kingdoms

References

 Chen, Shou (3rd century). Records of the Three Kingdoms, Volume 4, Biography of Cao Fang.
 Sima, Guang (1084). Zizhi Tongjian, volumes 75, 76.

Cao Wei empresses